Raiszaada is a 1991 Indian Hindi-language film directed by Bharat Kapoor, starring Shashi Kapoor, Asha Parekh, Govinda, Sonam in lead roles.

Cast
Shashi Kapoor
Asha Parekh
Govinda
Sonam
Johnny Lever
Gulshan Grover
Kulbhushan Kharbanda
Anupam Kher

Soundtrack
Lyrics: Indeevar

References

External links

1991 films
Films scored by Bappi Lahiri
1990s Hindi-language films